Gudrid Ida "Gudie" Hutchings  (born September 1, 1959) is a Canadian politician who has served as Minister of Rural Economic Development since October 26, 2021. A member of the Liberal Party, Hutchings has represented Long Range Mountains in the House of Commons since the 2015 election.

Background 
Hutchings was born on September 1, 1959, in Corner Brook to Arthur Lundrigan and Ida Lundrigan (née Johnson) and grew up in the Humber Valley. She attended Acadia University.

Prior to her election, Hutchings was a local businessperson with a nearly three-decade career, primarily in the tourism and outfitting industries. She owned fly fishing lodges in Labrador, spent more than ten years on the board of the Newfoundland and Labrador Outfitters Association – rising to the position of president, and served on the inaugural national board of the Canadian Federation of Outfitting Associations. She is also a former president of the Corner Brook Chamber of Commerce. At the time of her election, Hutchings was also the chair of the Battle Harbour Historic Trust. She volunteered for over 15 years with Girl Guides of Canada as a Brownie, Guide, Pathfinder, and Ranger Leader; further, Hutchings was a girl member during her childhood, calling it a "huge part of her growing up".

Political career 
Gerry Byrne, who held the riding of Humber—St. Barbe—Baie Verte for the Liberal Party since 1996, decided  not to run in the 2015 federal election in June 2014; instead, he opted to run in the 2015 provincial election. Hutchings, endorsed by Byrne, decided to run for the nomination in November 2014. She secured the nomination in March 2015 to run as the Liberal candidate in the riding of Long Range Mountains.

Hutchings was elected in the federal election, and on December 2, 2015, she was named the parliamentary secretary to the minister of small business and tourism. On November 6, 2017, Hutchings was appointed to the National Security and Intelligence Committee of Parliamentarians.

Hutchings was re-elected in the 2019 federal election, and on December 12, 2019, was appointed as the parliamentary secretary to the minister for women and gender equality and rural economic development, Maryam Monsef.

Following the 2021 federal election, Hutchings was re-elected; however, Monsef lost her seat. Prime Minister Justin Trudeau assigned Hutchings the Rural Economic Development portfolio.

Electoral record

References

External links 
 Official website

Living people
Members of the House of Commons of Canada from Newfoundland and Labrador
Liberal Party of Canada MPs
Members of the 29th Canadian Ministry
Members of the House of Commons of Canada from Nova Scotia
Members of the King's Privy Council for Canada
Women government ministers of Canada
Women members of the House of Commons of Canada
People from Corner Brook
Women in Newfoundland and Labrador politics
1959 births
21st-century Canadian politicians
21st-century Canadian women politicians